Sean Murphy (born March 21, 1964) is a former backstroke swimmer from Canada, who competed for six years on the Canada national swimming team, setting several national records.  Murphy competed in several international competitions, including the Pan Pacific Swimming Championships, Commonwealth Games, World University Games, FINA World Aquatics Championships, and the 1988 Summer Olympics in Seoul, South Korea.  There he finished in 8th in the final of the men's 100-metre backstroke.

Murphy attended Stanford University, and competed for the Stanford Cardinal swimming and diving team from 1985 to 1988.  As a college swimmer, he won three individual National Collegiate Athletic Association (NCAA) championships and contributed to three NCAA national team championships.  He would also earn an MBA from Harvard Business School.

See also
 List of Commonwealth Games medallists in swimming (men)

References

External links
 
 

1964 births
Living people
Anglophone Quebec people
Canadian male backstroke swimmers
Olympic swimmers of Canada
Swimmers from Montreal
Stanford Cardinal men's swimmers
Swimmers at the 1988 Summer Olympics
Commonwealth Games medallists in swimming
Commonwealth Games bronze medallists for Canada
Universiade medalists in swimming
Swimmers at the 1986 Commonwealth Games
Universiade silver medalists for Canada
Medalists at the 1985 Summer Universiade
Harvard Business School alumni
Medallists at the 1986 Commonwealth Games